is the twenty-eighth studio album by Japanese heavy metal band Loudness. It is their first double album, as well as the first album released on their own label, Katana Music. It was released to commemorate the band's 40th anniversary. It was later released worldwide through earMUSIC on July 29, 2022.

The album came in two editions: A regular edition, and a limited edition that includes a DVD featuring a live performance. It was not released on any digital music stores or streaming services upon launch but was later made available once released internationally.

The album debuted at number 5 on the Oricon weekly albums chart, being their highest charting album since 1992's Loudness, and at number 11 on the Billboard Japan Hot Albums Chart.

Track listing

Charts

References 

2021 albums
Loudness (band) albums